The Ca de Bou, also known as the Perro de Presa Mallorquin, Mallorca Mastiff or the Majorcan Bulldog, is a breed of bulldog type dogs from Majorca, the largest of the Balearic Islands.

History
The Ca de Bou was historically kept on the island of Majorca for the blood sports of bull-baiting and dog fighting. The breed likely developed during the period of Catalan influence over Majorca between 1270 and 1570 AD, their ancestors were likely mastiff-type dogs used on the island for controlling cattle. By the time of the British occupation of Majorca in the 18th century, both bull-baiting and dog fighting were well established on the island, and the Ca de Bou were favoured by the locals for these blood sports, being renowned for their ferocity and bravery.

With the outlawing of bull-baiting and dog fighting on Majorca in the 20th century, the Ca de Bou lost favour and their numbers dwindled to the brink of extinction. The breed was saved by enthusiasts from mainland Spain who began exhibiting it in conformation shows, eventually it was recognised by the Real Sociedad Canina de España. The breed is known as the Perro de Presa Mallorquin in Spanish, whilst in English they are known as the Majorcan Bulldog or occasionally the Majorcan Mastiff, Ca de Bou is their Catalan language name.

Description

The breed standard states the breed's short and rough coat is typically brindle, fawn or black in colour.

The breed's massive head has an extremely broad and powerful jaw is well suited to gripping a bull or another dog in the fighting pit.

The breed has a life expectancy of 10 to 12 years.

Character 
It is a peaceful dog who barks little, very affectionate and faithful to his masters, for whom he has an unfailing admiration. He has a balanced character which makes him a pleasant family dog. This breed is now respected as a good guard dog and a loyal family pet. Furthermore, he is a very obedient dog and an excellent guardian, sure of himself, dissuasive with the strangers and without any free aggressiveness.

His education must be firm but gentle, it will be necessary to take care to socialize him well towards the canine species to avoid any accident during a possible runaway.

He can be sensitive or reactive towards his fellow dogs of the same sex, especially between males.

Selective breeding for the show ring has softened the Ca de Bou's temperament, and they are now biddable and affectionate, although they retain the tenacity and alertness of their forbears.

Other names 

 Perro Dogo Mallorquín
 Perro de presa Mallorquín
 Mallorca Mastiff
 Mallorca Bulldog

Classification FCI (Fédération Cynologique Internationale) 
Group II

 Section 2 :
 no 249

The first standard was redacted in 1932. In 1964, The FCI approved his racial prototype and internationally recognize the race.

See also

 Dogs portal
 List of dog breeds

References 

FCI breeds
Bulldog breeds
Dog fighting breeds
Dog breeds originating in the Balearic Islands
Rare dog breeds
Catch dogs